Atwood is an unincorporated town, a post office, and a census-designated place (CDP) located in and governed by Logan County, Colorado, United States. The CDP is a part of the Sterling, CO Micropolitan Statistical Area. The Atwood post office has the ZIP Code 80722. At the United States Census 2010, the population of the Atwood CDP was 133, while the population of the 80722 ZIP Code Tabulation Area was 349 including adjacent areas.

History
The Atwood post office has been in operation since 1885. The community was named after John Atwood, a Unitarian minister.

Geography
Atwood is located in southwestern Logan County. U.S. Route 6 passes through the community, leading northeast  to Sterling, the county seat, and southwest  to Merino.

Climate
This climate type occurs mostly on the outsides of the true deserts, in low-latitude semi-arid steppe regions. The Köppen Climate Classification subtype for this climate is "BSk". (Tropical and Subtropical Steppe Climate).

Demographics

See also

Outline of Colorado
Index of Colorado-related articles
State of Colorado
Colorado cities and towns
Colorado census designated places
Colorado counties
Logan County, Colorado
List of statistical areas in Colorado
Sterling, CO Micropolitan Statistical Area

References

External links

Atwood @ Colorado.com
Logan County website

Census-designated places in Logan County, Colorado
Census-designated places in Colorado